Nyang bran (Tibetan ཉང་བྲན།) is a suburb district and valley located several kilometres north of the city of Lhasa, Tibet. The valley is noted for its hermitages, belonging to the Sera Monastery, one of the three great historical monasteries of Tibet. Pabonka Hermitage, Drakri Hermitage, Chupzang Nunnery and many others are located in the valley which offers scenic views of Lhasa. Mount Parasol lies on its western side on which the Pabonka Hermitage is located.

References

Valleys of Tibet
Populated places in Lhasa
Chengguan District, Lhasa
Township-level divisions of Tibet
Subdistricts of the People's Republic of China